Packaging machinery is used throughout all packaging operations, involving primary packages to distribution packs. This includes many packaging processes: fabrication, cleaning, filling, sealing, combining, labeling, overwrapping, palletizing.

Overview
Some packaging operations cannot be accomplished without packaging equipment. For example many packages include heat seals to prepare or seal a package. Heat sealers  are needed, even in slow labor-intensive operations.

With many industries, the effectiveness of the heat seal is critical to product safety so the heat sealing operation must closely controlled with documented Verification and validation protocols. Food, drug, and medical regulations require consistent seals on packages. Proper equipment is needed.

Automation

Packaging operations can be designed for variable package sizes and forms or for handling only uniform packages, where the machinery or packaging line is adjustable between production runs. Certainly slow manual operations allow workers to be flexible to package variation but also some automated lines can handle significant random variation.

Moving from manual operations, through semi-automatic operations to fully automated packaging lines offers advantages to some packagers. Other than the obvious control of labor costs, quality can be more consistent, and throughput can be optimized.
    
Efforts at packaging line automation increasingly use programmable logic controllers and robotics.

Large fully automatic packaging lines can involve several pieces of major equipment from different manufactures as well as conveyors and ancillary equipment. Integrating such systems can be a challenge. Often consultants or external engineering firms are used to coordinate large projects.

Choosing packaging machinery

Choosing packaging machinery includes an assessment of technical capabilities, labor requirements, worker safety, maintainability, serviceability, reliability, ability to integrate into the packaging line, capital cost, floorspace, flexibility (change-over, materials, multiple products, etc.), energy requirements, quality of outgoing packages, qualifications (for food, pharmaceuticals, etc.), throughput, efficiency, productivity, ergonomics, return on investment, etc.

Packaging machinery can be:
 purchased as standard, off-the-shelf equipment
 purchased custom-made or custom-tailored to specific operations
purchased refurbished and upgraded
 manufactured or modified by in-house engineers and maintenance staff

In addition to purchasing equipment, leasing options are often attractive.

Machinery must be compatible with the expected operating conditions. For example, cold temperature operations require special considerations. Some industries must perform periodic washdowns of all equipment. This high pressure chemical washing puts special demands on machinery and control systems. Condensation within closed portions of machinery can also be problematic.

Machinery needs to keep control of the product being packaged. For example, powders need to be stable, liquids cannot slosh out, etc.

Some manufacturers decide not to do their own packaging but to employ contract packagers to perform all or some operations.  Capital, labor, and other costs are outsourced.

Types of machinery

Packaging machines may be of the following general types:
 Accumulating and collating machines
 Blister packs, skin packs and vacuum packaging machines
 Bottle caps equipment, over-capping, lidding, closing, seaming and sealing machines
 Box, case, tray, and carrier forming, packing, unpacking, closing, and sealing machines
 Cartoning machines
 Cleaning, sterilizing, cooling and drying machines
 Coding, printing, marking, stamping, and imprinting machines
 Converting machines
 Conveyor belts, accumulating and related machines
 Feeding, orienting, placing and related machines
 Filling machines: handling dry, powdered, solid, liquid, gas, or viscous products
 Inspecting: visual, sound, metal detecting, etc.
 Label dispensers, printers, and applicators
 Orienting, unscrambling machines
 Package filling and closing machines
 Palletizing, depalletizing, unit load assembly
 Product identification: labeling, marking, etc.
 Sealing machines: heat sealer, tape, or glue units
 Security seals, tamper-evident bands, etc equipment
 Slitting machines, perforating, etc
 Strapping machines, banding machines, etc.
 Weighing machines: check weigher, multihead weigher
 Wrapping machines: flowwrapping, stretch wrapping, shrink wrap
 Form, fill and seal machines, bags, pouches
 Other specialty machinery: slitters, laser cutters, parts attachment, etc.

Function 
Packaging is necessary to protect products, and is now done mainly through the use of packaging machinery. Machinery plays increasingly important roles such as: 
 Improve labor productivity. Sliding blister sealing machine packaging machinery is much faster than manual packaging. One good example of this is the candy packing machine. Here, hundreds to thousands of candies can be wrapped in minutes.  
 Ensure packaging quality. Mechanical packaging is particularly important for exported goods to achieve consistent packaging. 
 Handle specialized requirements, such as vacuum packaging, inflatable packaging, skin packaging and pressure filling.
 Reduce labor and improve working conditions for bulky/heavy products.
 Protect workers from health effects brought by dust, toxic/hazardous products and prevent environmental contamination. 
 Reduce packaging costs and save storage costs for loose products, such as cotton, tobacco, silk, linen, etc., by simply using compression packaging.
 Reliably ensure product hygiene by eliminating hand contact with food and medicines.

Gallery

See also
 Clean-in-place
 Cobot
 Hazard analysis and critical control points
 Material-handling equipment
 Packaging Machinery Manufacturers Institute
 Packaging Machinery Technology
 Queueing theory
 SCADA

References

Books, general references
 Yam, K.L., "Encyclopedia of Packaging Technology", John Wiley & Sons, 2009, 
 Soroka, W, Illustrated Glossary of Packaging Terminology Institute of Packaging Professionals, 
 Soroka, W, "Fundamentals of Packaging Technology", Chapter 19 – Packaging Machinery, IoPP, 2002, 
 Henry J R, "Packaging Machinery Handbook", 2012, 
 Kay, M.G., 2012, Material Handling Equipment, Retrieved 2014-10-02.

External links
 

 
Packaging
Industrial automation
Control engineering
Industrial equipment